Major General Huỳnh Văn Cao (26 September 1927 – 26 February 2013) was a major general in the Army of the Republic of Vietnam.

Life
In 1950, he graduated from Military school in Huế. He then attended College of Tactics and graduated in Hanoi in 1952. He went to the United States and attended Command and General Staff College and he graduated in 1958.

He was the commander of the Army of the Republic of Vietnam (ARVN) 7th Division. He worked with Lieutenant Colonel John Paul Vann, most notably during the Battle of Ap Bac. He served as Senate First Vice President in the government of South Vietnam.

After the Fall of Saigon, he was left behind in South Vietnam and imprisoned until 1987. He came to the United States in 1990. He was a contributing writer for the Vietnam Magazine and the author of Vietnam: Today & Tomorrow.

Personal life
He was married and had ten children and more than 19 grandchildren. He is remembered for the quote "President Nixon can support President Thieu, but President Nixon cannot force the Vietnamese people to support President Thieu."

Key dates

Military positions
 Platoon Leader, 1950–51 
 Company commander, 1951–52 
 Battalion commander, 1953–54 
 Chief of the Special Staff, Presidency 1955-57 
 Commander, 13th Infantry Division, 1957–58 
 Commander, 7th Infantry Division and Tien Giang Tactical Zone, 1959–62 
 Chief negotiator, Vietnamese Delegation to Meeting with Cambodian Delegation on Vietnam-Cambodia Borders, March 1964 
 General commissioner, Popular Complaints and Suggestions Office, 4 May 1964 
 Chief, General Political Warfare Department, 1965–66 
 Commanding General, First Corps, 16–30 May 1966

Political career
Chairman, Social Democrat Bloc, Senate, 1967–1968 
Chairman, foreign Affairs and Information Committee, Senate, 1968 
First Deputy Chairman, Senate, 1970–1971 
Senator, 1971–1975

Decorations and awards
 Commander of the National Order of Vietnam 
 Officer of the National Order of Vietnam with Gallantry Cross with Palm 
 Knight of the National Order of Vietnam with Gallantry Cross with Palm

References

External links
Vietnam:Today & Tomorrow
Major General Huynh Van Cao
Document 11. Telegram From the Embassy in Vietnam to the Department of State concerning Major General Huynh Van Cao
The Battle at Ap Bac Changed America's View of the Vietnam War
VIETNAM - History, Documents, and Opinion

1927 births
2013 deaths
Army of the Republic of Vietnam generals
Vietnamese emigrants to the United States
Vietnamese Roman Catholics
People from Huế
Vietnamese exiles
People from Virginia
Non-U.S. alumni of the Command and General Staff College
Vietnamese politicians
Personalist Labor Revolutionary Party politicians

3 Huynh, Van Cao